The Charlatan is a 1917 Hungarian film directed by Michael Curtiz.

Cast
 Gyula Csortos as Tordai Dezsõ medikus
 Margit T. Halmi as Horváth János anyja
 Ica von Lenkeffy as Ilma, Horváth János húga
 Tivadar Uray as Horváth János medikus
 László Z. Molnár as Zsámoly úr, a riporter
 Giza Báthory as Csáthyné
 Lajos Réthey

See also
 Michael Curtiz filmography

References

External links
 

Films directed by Michael Curtiz
Hungarian black-and-white films
Hungarian silent feature films
1917 Austro-Hungarian films